Leave It to Todhunter is a 1958 British television series which originally aired on the BBC in 1958. It is based on the 1937 novel Trial and Error by Anthony Berkeley.

Synopsis
Lawrence Todhunter, a mild-mannered little man, discovers he likely has less than six months to live. He resolves to do the world a service by killing an evil character, knowing he will not have to face the consequences. Things go awry when an innocent man is arrested for the killing.

Cast
 Mervyn Johns as Lawrence Todhunter
 Gladys Boot as Mrs. Farroway
 Margaret Anderson as Viola Palmer
 Kynaston Reeves as  Ambrose Chitterwick
 Ballard Berkeley as  Det. Chief Insp. Moresby
 Peter Bryant as  Det. Sgt. Williams
 Helen Cherry as  Marcia Loraine
 Campbell Cotts as Sir Ernest Prettiboy
 John Rae as Dr. Kelsey
 Michael Scott as Vincent Palmer
 Ann Firbank as Felicity Farroway
 Lockwood West as Mr. Budd
 Richard Caldicot as Nicholas Farroway
 Hugh Morton as Arthur Furze, MP
 Shirley Cooklin as Helen
 Arthur Lowe as Gunsmith
 Jennifer Daniel as Girl

References

Bibliography
Baskin, Ellen . Serials on British Television, 1950-1994. Scolar Press, 1996.

External links
 

BBC television dramas
1958 British television series debuts
1958 British television series endings
English-language television shows
Television shows based on British novels